Kadoma may refer to:

Kadoma, Osaka, Japan
Kadoma, Zimbabwe
Kadoma District, Zimbabwe